David Robert Bowe (born 19 July 1955) was a Member of the European Parliament for Labour from 1989 to 2004.

Bowe was educated at Sunderland Polytechnic, Teesside Polytechnic, and the University of Bath.  He worked as a science teacher, and became active in the Labour Party, serving on Middlesbrough District Council, and on the executive of the party's northern region.

Bowe was elected to the European Parliament at the 1989 European Parliament election, representing Cleveland & Yorkshire North (1989–1994), then Cleveland & Richmond (1994–1999) and Yorkshire and the Humber (1999–2004).

Bowe stood for re-election in 2004, but was defeated.

References

External links
 David Bowe website

1955 births
Living people
Councillors in North East England
Labour Party (UK) councillors
Labour Party (UK) MEPs
MEPs for England 1989–1994
MEPs for England 1994–1999
MEPs for England 1999–2004
Alumni of Teesside University